Jeremy Blackman (born 1987) is an American actor and musician. He starred in the 1999 film Magnolia. He graduated from Columbia University in 2009. He was the lead vocalist for the alternative dance and indie electronic band Pink Drink. He produced experimental music as William Irish. His father, Ian, is also an actor.

Filmography

Film

Television

References

External links
 

American male film actors
American male television actors
Columbia College (New York) alumni
1987 births
Living people
20th-century American male actors
20th-century American male singers
20th-century American singers
21st-century American male actors
21st-century American male singers
21st-century American singers